Sinan Ören (born 21 November 1987) is a Turkish footballer who plays as a goalkeeper.

Ören appeared in seven Süper Lig matches during the 2008–09 season and ten TFF First League matches during the 2006–07 and 2007–08 seasons with Eskişehirspor.

He also is a nephew of the legendary goalkeeper of Eskişehirspor, Sinan Alağaç.

External links
 
 
 Profile at futbolig.com.tr 
 
 

1987 births
Sportspeople from Eskişehir
Living people
Turkish footballers
Turkey youth international footballers
Association football goalkeepers
Eskişehirspor footballers
Göztepe S.K. footballers
Balıkesirspor footballers
Şanlıurfaspor footballers
Zonguldakspor footballers
Süper Lig players
TFF Second League players
TFF First League players
Competitors at the 2018 Mediterranean Games
Mediterranean Games competitors for Turkey